Andrea White is a Republican member of the Ohio House of Representatives representing the 36th district. She was elected in 2020, defeating Democrat Cate Berger with 56% of the vote.

References

Living people
Republican Party members of the Ohio House of Representatives
21st-century American politicians
People from Kettering, Ohio
Year of birth missing (living people)